The 1997-98 Azerbaijan Top League was the seventh season of the Azerbaijan Top League, since their independence from the USSR in August 1991, and was contested by 15 clubs. Kapaz won their second title and Qarabağ and the Azerbaijan U-18 team were relegated. Khazri Buzovna pulled out of the league and dissolved after 8 games, as did Kur Nur at the end of the season.

Teams

Stadia and locations

1Qarabağ played their home matches at Surakhani Stadium in Baku before moving to their current stadium on 3 May 2009.

League table

Results

Season statistics

Top scorers

References

External links
Azerbaijan 1997-98 RSSSF
APL Stats

Azerbaijan Premier League seasons
Azer
1997–98 in Azerbaijani football